Tyler Griffey (born September 29, 1990) is an American former professional basketball player who last played for the Allianz Swans Gmunden of the Austrian Basketball League. He played college basketball for the University of Illinois.

High school career
Griffey played for Lafayette High School, and was coached by Scott Allen and Dave Porter. The summer prior to his senior year, Griffey was selected to play as a member of the 2009 Adidas Nations USA team among the likes of Brandon Knight, Lance Stephenson, and Derrick Favors; the team was coached by Paul Silas. As a senior, Griffey was named a member of the 2009 Missouri All-State Team as selected by the Missouri Sportswriters and Sportscasters Association and also left Lafayette High School as their all-time scorer and rebounder.

College career
Griffey is best known for his uncontested buzzer beater layup with 0.9 seconds left to lead the unranked Illinois Fighting Illini to a 74–72 upset home win over the #1 ranked Indiana Hoosiers during the 2012–13 season.

College statistics

|-
| style="text-align:left;"| 2009–10
| style="text-align:left;"| Illinois
| 32 || 4 || 8.4 || .525 || .350 || .875 || 1.75 || 0.30 || 0.03 || 0.10 || 3.3
|-
| style="text-align:left;"| 2010–11
| style="text-align:left;"| Illinois
| 26 || 0 || 6.5 || .333 || .364 || .667 || 1.15 || 0.00 || 0.02 || 0.10 || 1.6
|-
| style="text-align:left;"| 2011–12
| style="text-align:left;"| Illinois
| 30 || 20 || 16.5 || .431 || .286 || .750 || 3.33 || 0.60 || 0.40 ||0.40 || 4.9
|-
| style="text-align:left;"| 2012–13
| style="text-align:left;"| Illinois
| 36 || 21 || 21.8|| .434 || .347 || .686 || 3.47 || 0.60 || 0.60 || 0.60|| 7.2
|-

Professional career
After going undrafted in the 2013 NBA draft, Griffey signed with the Allianz Swans Gmunden of the Austrian Basketball League in Gmunden, Austria.

Professional statistics

|-
| style="text-align:left;"| 2013–14
| style="text-align:left;"| Allianz Swans Gmunden
| 35 || 32 || 28.1 || .534 || .380 || .787 || 4.74 || 0.94 || 0.77 || 0.60 || 14.26
|-
| style="text-align:left;"| 2014–15
| style="text-align:left;"| Allianz Swans Gmunden
| 23 || 18 || 26.3 || .557 || .440 || .741 || 4.48 || 0.83 || 1.30 || 0.65 || 15.43
|-

Personal life
Griffey majored in kinesiology at the University of Illinois. He is the son of Chris and Deanna Griffey and has two younger sisters, Brenna and Taryn, and a younger brother, Trey. Griffey also has an uncle, Rich Stephens, who was a member of the Oakland Raiders as an offensive lineman from 1992–1996. Griffey also attended the same high school as former Illinois basketball player Robert Archibald.

References

External links
Profile at FIBA.com
Profile at Eurobasket.com
Profile at FightingIllini.com

1990 births
Living people
Swans Gmunden players
American expatriate basketball people in Austria
Basketball players from Missouri
Forwards (basketball)
Illinois Fighting Illini men's basketball players
Sportspeople from St. Louis County, Missouri
American men's basketball players